AWO may refer to:

 Air Warfare Officer, Singapore Air Force
 Agricultural Workers Organization
 All Wrestling Organization, a wrestling organization in Israel
 American Waterways Operators
 Arlington Municipal Airport (Washington)
 Awtowelo, a motorcycle made by Simson

See also
 Awo (disambiguation)